Red Silent Tides is the sixth album by Italian folk/power metal band Elvenking. It was released on September 17, 2010, through AFM Records in both standard and Deluxe Editions. The Deluxe Edition of Red Silent Tides included a second disc which contained their first demo album To Oak Woods Bestowed as a bonus disc. This album would also feature Raffaello "Rafahel" Indri on guitars alongside Aydan. Also this album would not feature Elyghen on Violins due to his trip out of Italy and was replaced by session player Fabio "Lethien" Polo for the remainder until Elyghen's return.

Two singles from the album so far have been released from the album "The Cabal" as the first and "Your Heroes Are Dead" as the second.

Reception 
Eduardo Rivadavia of AllMusic called it "an extremely well-crafted collection of melodic power metal with prog/folk/gothic benefits." Metal.de gave the film a mediocre review, saying it was an improvement over the band's previous releases.

David E. Gehlke of Dead Rhetoric gave the film a mostly positive review, but criticized the band's "untapped potential". Trevor Portz of Hard Rock Haven called it "well-written, fun heavy metal."

Track listing

Japanese bonus tracks

Digipack special edition

Personnel 
Damnagoras -  Vocals
Aydan - Guitars
Rafahel - Guitars
Gorlan - Bass
Zender - Drums
Lethien - Violin

References

External links 
 

2010 albums
Elvenking (band) albums
AFM Records albums